Stanisław Trepczyński (7 April 1924 – 20 June 2002) was a Polish diplomat, who served as the 27th president of the United Nations General Assembly.

Early life and education
Trepczyński was born in Łódź, Poland, on 7 April 1924. His father was a lawyer. He was a graduate of Lodz University and received a master's degree in economics.

Career
Trepczyński joined the Lodz Committee of the Polish Workers Party (later the Polish United Worker's Party) in 1946. In 1951, he became the secretary of the Polish peace committee. He was appointed deputy minister of foreign affairs in 1971. From 1972 to 1973 he served as the 27th president of the United Nations General Assembly.

Personal life
Trepczyński married twice and had three sons.

References

External links

20th-century Polish politicians
1924 births
2002 deaths
Diplomats from Łódź
People from Łódź Voivodeship (1919–1939)
University of Łódź alumni
Polish Workers' Party politicians
Presidents of the United Nations General Assembly
Burials at Powązki Military Cemetery